Songjiang Nanjing is a metro station in Taipei, Taiwan served by Taipei Metro.

Station overview
This underground station has an island platform for the Zhonghe-Xinlu line and has two side platforms for the Songshan-Xindian line. It is located beneath the intersection of Songjiang Rd. and Nanjing East Rd. (hence the name of the station), and opened in November 2010 with the opening of the Luzhou Line and the Taipei City section of the Xinzhuang Line.

Construction
Excavation depth for this station was around 29 meters for the Xinzhuang Line station and 20 meters for the Songshan Line station. The Xinzhuang Line station is 191 meters in length and 32 meters wide, while the Songshan Line station is 202 meters in length and 26 meters wide. It has eight entrances, two accessibility elevators, and four vent shafts. Two of the entrances and a vent shaft are integrated with joint development buildings. One entrance is integrated with the Council for Economic Planning and Development building. The station is equipped with platform screen doors for both lines.

Public Art
The theme for the Songshan Line station is "Metropolitan Images of Daily Life" (都會眾生相). It uses four elements (earth, fire, water, wind) to present surreal situations of the combination of city and nature.
Earth: Business in the City Jungle
Fire: University in a Flash
Water: Office Under the Sea
Wind: Coffee Shop Floating in the Clouds

History
On 1 June 2003, construction began. It was opened on 3 November 2010 for the Zhonghe–Xinlu Line followed by the opening of Songshan-Xindian Line on 15 November 2014.

Station layout

Around the station
 Miniatures Museum of Taiwan
 Suho Memorial Paper Museum

References

2010 establishments in Taiwan
Railway stations opened in 2010
Songshan–Xindian line stations
Zhonghe–Xinlu line stations